The 1979–80 season was Colchester United's 38th season in their history and third successive season in third tier of English football, the Third Division. Alongside competing in the Third Division, the club also participated in the FA Cup and the League Cup.

An excellent season in the league took Colchester to their highest finish since the 1956–57 season with fifth position, having occupied the top four spots for the majority of the campaign. Colchester exited the FA Cup in round three to Reading, while they fell to defeat after a penalty shoot-out to First Division side Aston Villa.

Season overview
With a very much unchanged squad from the previous campaign, Colchester faced First Division opposition in the League Cup second round after beating Watford over two legs in the first round. Rekindling memories of the Quarter-final tie five years prior, the U's were drawn at home to Aston Villa, who won 2–0 at Layer Road. However, in the away fixture at Villa Park, Colchester earned a 2–0 victory to take the tie to extra time and penalties. The penalty takers were successful enough that it was necessary for the goalkeepers to take their turns. Mike Walker stepped up to take his penalty for Colchester and missed, meaning the U's bowed out 9–8.

Keeping track with the league leaders for much of the season – and even being level on points with first-placed Sheffield United at one stage – Colchester had ten away wins to their name before successive defeats to Blackpool, Blackburn Rovers and Reading in February and March 1980. Injuries to Steve Foley and Bobby Gough contributed to the U's downturn in form, and having occupied a top four spot for much of the season, Colchester had to be content with a fifth-place finish, six points short of the promotion places. It was the closest United had come to Second Division football since the 1956–57 season, but attendances weren't reflective of on-field performance, with a league average gate of 3,818, the third-lowest in the division ahead of Wimbledon and Chester.

Players

Transfers

In

 Total spending:  ~ £0

Out

 Total incoming:  ~ £0

Match details

Third Division

Results round by round

League table

Matches

League Cup

FA Cup

Squad statistics

Appearances and goals

|-
!colspan="14"|Players who appeared for Colchester who left during the season

|}

Goalscorers

Disciplinary record

Clean sheets
Number of games goalkeepers kept a clean sheet.

Player debuts
Players making their first-team Colchester United debut in a fully competitive match.

See also
List of Colchester United F.C. seasons

References

General
Books

Websites

Specific

1979-80
English football clubs 1979–80 season